ZZ or zz may refer to:

Music
 ZZ (band), a Japanese rock band
 ZZ Top, an American rock band
 "Zz", a silent track on the 2014 album Sleepify by Vulfpeck

People
 Z. Z. Hill (1935–1984), an American blues singer
 ZZ Packer (born 1973), an American writer 
 ZZ Ward, Zsuzsanna Eva Ward (born 1986), an American musician

Science and mathematics

Astronomy
 ZZ Boötis, a star system in the constellation Boötes
 ZZ diboson, a pair of Z bosons
 ZZ Ceti, a type of pulsating white dwarf star
 G 29-38 or ZZ Piscium, a variable white dwarf star

Other uses in science and mathematics
 ZZ zinc finger, a type of protein domain
 , the Zahlen symbol, representing the set of integers
 Zamioculcas or ZZ plant, a genus of flowering plant in the family Araceae
 ZZ, homogametic males under the ZW sex-determination system
 ZZ, homogametic males under the ZO sex-determination system

Transportation
 Isuzu Gemini ZZ/R, a subcompact car
 Tommykaira ZZ, a mid-engined sports car 
 Toyota ZZ engine, a straight-4 piston engine series
 Kawasaki ZZ-R1200, a motorcycle

Other uses
 ZZ Leiden, a basketball club based in Leiden, Netherlands
 ZZ scale, a 1:300 model railroad scale 
 Živi zid ("Human Shield"), a political party in Croatia
 Zhongzhi Capital or ZZ Capital, an asset management company
 ZZ method, in speedcubing
 ZZ, the production code for the 1969 Doctor Who serial The War Games

See also 
 Sleep (disambiguation)
 Z (disambiguation)
 Zzz (disambiguation)
 Zzzz (disambiguation)
 ZZR (disambiguation)